Hank Locklin is a self-titled studio album by American country singer–songwriter Hank Locklin. It was released in March 1962 via RCA Camden records. It was Locklin's first album released on the RCA Camden label was co-produced by Chet Atkins and Steve Sholes. The album was Locklin's fifth proper studio effort, which compiled a handful of songs previously not released on albums. A total of 12 tracks were contained on the record. This included 1961 hit, "From Here to There to You."

Background and content
Hank Locklin signed to RCA Records in 1955 and recorded for three years before a studio album was issued. However, it would be several more years before the release of another proper studio release. RCA began releasing more Locklin albums by the early 1960s after he had further success with the crossover hit, "Please Help Me, I'm Falling." Albums were released on RCA Victor and its budget label, RCA Camden. His 1961 self-titled album was his first to be issued on RCA Camden. A total of twelve tracks were included on the album.

The tracks were taken from sessions recorded between 1955 and 1960. None of the material had previously been issued on albums. The album's earliest sessions between 1955 and 1956 were produced by Steve Sholes, who originally signed Locklin to the RCA label. Beginning in late 1956, the songs were produced by Chet Atkins. The self-titled LP contained two tracks composed by Locklin: "First Time" and "The Same Sweet Girl." The latter was a re-recording of the original 1949 hit. Other songs on the LP were composed by songwriters such as Cy Coben and Cindy Walker.

Release and reception
Locklin's self-titled album was released in March 1962 via RCA Camden. It was Locklin's fifth studio album in his career. The album was originally released as a vinyl LP, containing six songs on each side of the record. The record contained five singles. The earliest single was "A Good Woman's Love," which was first issued in February 1956. The second single, "Seven or Eleven," was issued in June 1956. The third single was "She's Better Than Most," which was issued in October 1956. In January 1957, "Fourteen Karat Gold" was issued as a single. None of these songs made any national Billboard charts.

The final single included was "From Here to There to You." It was originally issued in April 1961 on RCA Victor Records. The single spent seven weeks on the Billboard Hot Country and Western Sides chart before peaking at number 12 in June 1961. The LP was given a favorable rating from Allmusic, receiving four out of five possible stars.

Track listing

Personnel
All credits are adapted from the liner notes of Hank Locklin.

Musical personnel
 Chet Atkins – guitar
 Floyd Cramer – piano
 Jimmy Day – steel guitar
 Ray Edenton – rhythm guitar
 Hank Garland – guitar
 Buddy Harman – drums
 Tommy Jackson – fiddle
 The Jordanaires – background vocals
 The Anita Kerr Singers – background vocals
 Hank Locklin – lead vocals
 Grady Martin – guitar
 Bob Moore – bass
 Ernie Newton – bass
 Dale Potter – fiddle
 Sam Pruett – guitar
 Jack Shook – rhythm guitar
 Velma Smith – rhythm guitar
 Tommy Vaden – fiddle

Technical personnel
 Chet Atkins – producer
 Steve Sholes – producer

Release history

References

1962 albums
Albums produced by Chet Atkins
Albums produced by Steve Sholes
Hank Locklin albums
RCA Camden albums